Bartonella florencae is a bacterium from the genus of Bartonella which has been isolated from a dead shrew (Crocidura russula) from Calanque d'En-Vau in France.

References

External links
Type strain of Bartonella florencae at BacDive -  the Bacterial Diversity Metadatabase	

Bartonellaceae
Bacteria described in 2014